Brahmagiri is a Vidhan Sabha constituency of Puri district, Odisha, India.

This constituency includes Bramhagiri block, Krushnapraad block and 11 Gram panchayats (Kanheibidyadharpur, Gaudakera, Bijaya Ramachandrapur, Pratapramchandrapur, Biranarasinghapur, Birabalabhadrapur, Pratappurusottampur, Hantuka, Basudevpur, Kerandipur and Bhailipur) of Puri sadar block.

Elected Members

Fifteen elections were held between 1951 and 2014.
Elected members from the Brahmagiri constituency are:
2019: (108): Lalitendu Bidyadhar Mohapatra (BJP)
2014: (108): Sanjay Kumar Das Burma (BJD)
2009: (108): Sanjay Kumar Das Burma (BJD)
2004: (57): Lalatendu Bidyadhar Mohapatra (Congress)
2000: (57): Lalatendu Bidyadhar Mohapatra (Congress)
1995: (57): Lalatendu Bidyadhar Mohapatra (Congress)
1990: (57): Ajay Kumar Jena (Janata Dal)
1985: (57): Gangadhar Mohapatra (Congress)
1980: (57): Gangadhar Mohapatra (Congress-I)
1977: (57): Ajaya Kumar Jena (Janata Party)
1974: (57): Siddheswar Panigrahi (CPM)
1971: (53): Gopabandhu Patra (Congress)
1967: (53): Braja Mohan Mohanty (Congress)
1961: (90): Gopabandhu Patra (Independent)
1957: (62): Padma Charan Samanta Sinhar (Congress)
1951: (87): Biswanath Parida (Independent)

2019 Election Result

2014 Election Result
In 2014 election, Biju Janata Dal candidate Sanjay Kumar Das Burma defeated Indian National Congress candidate Lalatendu Bidyadhar Mohapatra by a margin of 1,341 votes.

2009 Election Result
In 2009 election, Biju Janata Dal candidate Sanjay Kumar Das Burma defeated Indian National Congress candidate Lalatendu Bidyadhar Mohapatra by a margin of 4,886 votes.

Notes

References

Assembly constituencies of Odisha
Puri district